Agari Bujaq (also Romanized as Agarī Būjāq; also known as Agrī Bījār, Egrī Būjāq, and Qanbar Maḩalleh) is a village in Lisar Rural District, Kargan Rud District, Talesh County, Gilan Province, Iran. At the 2006 census, its population was 318, in 73 families.

References 

Populated places in Talesh County